"I'm Gonna Miss You, Girl" is a song written by Jesse Winchester, and recorded by American country music artist Michael Martin Murphey.  It was released in October 1987 as the lead single from the album River of Time, peaking at number 3 on the U.S. Billboard Hot Country Singles chart and at number 4 on the Canadian RPM Country Tracks chart.

Charts

Weekly charts

Year-end charts

References

1987 singles
Michael Martin Murphey songs
Songs written by Jesse Winchester
Warner Records singles